Lepanto was an Italian ironclad battleship built for the Italian Regia Marina (Royal Navy), the second and last ship of the . Lepanto was laid down in November 1876, launched in March 1883, and completed in August 1887. Unlike other capital ships of the era, Lepanto had an armored deck rather than the more typical belt armor.

Lepanto spent the first two decades of her career in the Active and Reserve Squadrons, where she took part in annual training maneuvers with the rest of the fleet. In 1902, she was withdrawn from service for use as a training ship. During the Italo-Turkish War of 1911–1912, the ship provided fire support to Italian troops defending Tripoli in Libya. Lepanto was ultimately stricken from the naval register in January 1914 and sold for scrapping in March 1915.

Design

The Italia class, designed by Benedetto Brin, was ordered  in the mid-1870s as part of a naval construction program aimed at countering the Austro-Hungarian Navy. These included more powerful main guns, higher freeboard, and greater speed. Their speed came at the expense of armor protection, and their hulls carried only light deck plating.

She had a crew of 37 officers and 656 enlisted men.

Her propulsion system consisted of four compound steam engines each driving a single screw propeller, with steam supplied by eight coal-fired, oval boilers and sixteen fire-tube boilers.

Lepanto was armed with a main battery of four  27-caliber guns, mounted in two pairs en echelon in a central barbette. She carried a secondary battery of eight  32-caliber guns and four  32-caliber guns. As was customary for capital ships of the period, she carried four  torpedo tubes in the hull above the waterline, two per broadside.

Unlike other ships built at the time, Lepanto dispensed with vertical belt armor. Brin believed that contemporary steel alloys could not effectively defeat armor-piercing shells of the day, and so he discarded it completely. The barbette had  of compound armor.

Service history

Construction–1895

Lepanto, named for the Battle of Lepanto of 1571, was under construction for nearly 11 years. She was laid down at the Cantiere navale fratelli Orlando shipyard at Livorno on 4 November 1876, ten months after her sister Italia. She spent nearly six-and-a-half years on the building ways and was not launched until 17 March 1883, two-and-a-half years after Italia. Lepanto was not completed for another four-and-a-half years, her construction finally being finished on 16 August 1887, twenty-two months after the completion of Italia. She thereafter conducted sea trials through May 1888.

The maneuvers consisted of close-order drills and a simulated attack on and defense of La Spezia. Later that year, the ship was present during a naval review held for the German Kaiser Wilhelm II during a visit to Italy. She remained in the unit for the next two years. The exercises were conducted in the Tyrrhenian Sea, where the First Squadron was tasked with defending against an attacking "hostile" squadron.

In 1891, she was placed in reserve, where she remained until being recommissioned in April 1892. The ship served as the flagship of Permanent Squadron in 1893, flying the flag of Vice Admiral Prince Thomas, Duke of Genoa. On 27 April, Lepanto hosted King Umberto I of Italy and Kaiser Wilhelm II during the latter's visit to Italy. During the maneuvers, which lasted from 6 August to 5 September, the ships of the Active Squadron simulated a French attack on the Italian fleet. Lepanto nearly collided with her sister ship Italia during the exercises. Beginning on 14 October 1894, the Italian fleet, including Lepanto, assembled in Genoa for a naval review held in honor of King Umberto I at the commissioning of the new ironclad . The festivities lasted three days.

That year, unrest in the Ottoman Empire that killed hundreds of foreign nationals prompted several of the European great powers to send an international fleet to pressure the Ottomans into compensating the victims. This second squadron was stocked with coal and ammunition in the event that it would need to reinforce the squadron at Smryna.

1897–1915
Lepanto operated as a training ship for bridge personnel from 26 March to 20 July 1896. In June 1897, Lepanto steamed to Britain to represent Italy at the Fleet Review for Queen Victoria's Diamond Jubilee. For the periodic fleet maneuvers later that year, Lepanto was assigned to the First Division of the Reserve Squadron, which also included the ironclads Duilio and Ruggiero di Lauria and the protected cruiser . The following year, the Reserve Squadron consisted of Lepanto, Ruggiero di Lauria, Francesco Morosini, and five cruisers. In 1899, Lepanto, Re Umberto, and the three s served in the Active Squadron, which was kept in service for eight months of the year, with the remainder spent with reduced crews.

In the early 1890s, the Italian Navy had considered rebuilding Lepanto along the same lines as Enrico Dandolo, which had received new, quick-firing  guns in place of her slow 432 mm guns. Lepanto and her sister were to have their guns replaced with new  guns, but by 1902 this plan had been abandoned as too costly. Lepanto was instead withdrawn from front-line service in March that year and she became a gunnery training ship based in La Spezia. By that time, her armament consisted of her original 432 mm guns and four of her 119 mm guns; to these, nine  40-caliber guns, six  25-caliber guns, and two machine guns had been added. Her torpedo tubes had been removed by this time. During the annual fleet maneuvers in September and October 1907, Lepanto was present to carry observers of the exercises, though she did not directly take part in the training.

Lepanto served in as a gunnery training vessel until 16 October 1910, when she was reduced to a barracks ship. At the start of the Italo-Turkish War of 1911–1912, Lepanto was assigned to the 5th Division of the Italian fleet, along with her sister Italia and the ironclad Enrico Dandolo. In December 1911, Italia and Lepanto were prepared to be sent to Tripoli, to replace the three s. There, they were to support the Italian garrison that had captured the city. The Italian Navy planned to send the two ships in large part because it had a large stockpile of 432 mm shells, but the plan was never actually carried out. Lepanto was struck from the naval register on 26 May 1912, but was reinstated on 21 January 1913 as a first-class auxiliary ship. During this period, she was used to train apprentices and various specialists at La Spezia. She was stricken a second time on 1 January 1914, sold for scrap on 27 March 1915, and subsequently broken up.

Footnotes

Notes

Citations

References

External links
 Lepanto (1883) Marina Militare website

1883 ships
Italia-class battleships
Ships built in Livorno